The 4th East Asian Basketball Championship were the qualifying tournament of the 2017 FIBA Asia Cup. It served also as a subzone championship involving the East Asian basketball teams. The tournament was hosted by the city of Nagano in Japan from 3 to 7 June 2017. The Chinese Taipei won their first title after defeating the defending champions, Korea in the Finals, 77–64. Japan beat China to take the bronze medal, 76–58.

For the first time in the history of the tournament, five teams have qualified for the Asian continental championship due to two extra berths were added from the 2016 FIBA Asia Challenge.

Results

Preliminary round

Group A

Group B

Classification 5th–6th
Winner has qualified to the 2017 FIBA Asia Cup.

Final round

Semifinals

Bronze medal match

Final

References

East Asia Basketball Championship
2017 in Asian sport
International basketball competitions hosted by Japan
Sports competitions in Nagano (city)
EABA Championship